Sunampe District is one of eleven districts of the province Chincha in Peru.

References

1944 establishments in Peru
States and territories established in 1944